= Gandabommanahalli =

Coordinates: 14°46′N 76°35′E

Gandabommanahalli is a village in the southern state of Karnataka, India.

== See also ==
- Bellary
- Districts of Karnataka
